Corbin Park (also known as the Blue Mountain Forest and Game Preserve) is a private game preserve in New Hampshire. It contains land in Croydon, Cornish, Plainfield, and Grantham. The park is known today for its secrecy.

History
Austin Corbin founded the park in 1889 by buying up a large number of parcels of land in western New Hampshire. The nonprofit Blue Mountain Association was created in 1891 to manage the park. After Corbin died in 1896, his son Austin Jr. took over management of the Association and the park, and held the role until his own death in 1938. In 1944 ownership of the park was transferred to a group of wealthy hunters. In 1949, the New Hampshire legislature passed a law holding the park responsible for escaped pigs. The park has been subject to multiple lawsuits from the 1950s to the 1990s.

In 2020, NH state representative Renny Cushing filed legislation to require a special safari hunting license to take exotic game from the park. It was not passed.

Geography
It is not accessible to hikers.

Flora and fauna
Corbin Park is home to bison, deer, elk, pheasants, and wild hogs. Some of these animals have been known to escape on several occasions, such as when the 1938 New England hurricane knocked down much of the park fence, or when the gates were left open in 1953 for firefighting purposes. A wild boar that had escaped from Corbin Park was struck and killed on Interstate 89 in Lebanon in 2017.

Notable hunters
Many famous people have been known to hunt at or otherwise visit the park, including Teddy Roosevelt, Grover Cleveland, Herbert Hoover, Rudyard Kipling, Joe DiMaggio, William Ruger, Sr., and his son, William Junior.

References

External links
Brian Meyette's Corbin Park page
"Austin Corbin, the 'Part-Hog, Part-Shark' Robber Baron of New Hampshire", from the New England Historical Society
Corbin's "Animal Garden", article archived from Eastman Living

1880s establishments in New Hampshire
Cornish, New Hampshire
Hunting in the United States
Hunting lodges in the United States
Plainfield, New Hampshire